Pt.Tek Chand Sharma is a former member of the Delhi Legislative Assembly from Indian National Congress, representing the Saket Constituency twice, in 1993 and 1998 .

In the 1998 Delhi Legislative Assembly election, Sharma contested on an Indian National Congress ticket against Vijay Jolly of the BJP in the Saket Constituency and won the election.

References

Delhi Legislative Assembly